The 1998 German Open was a men's tennis tournament played on outdoor clay courts. It was the 92nd edition of the Hamburg Masters (German Open), and was part of the ATP Super 9 of the 1998 ATP Tour. It took place at the Rothenbaum Tennis Center in Hamburg, Germany, from through 4 May through 11 May 1998.

The men's field was headlined by ATP No. 1, Indian Wells, Miami, Auckland titlist, Australian Open finalist Marcelo Ríos, Antwerp winner, Indian Wells and 1997 U.S. Open runner-up Greg Rusedski and Marseille runner-up, 1994 Hamburg winner Yevgeny Kafelnikov. Other top seeds competing were Dubai titlist Àlex Corretja, Gustavo Kuerten, Karol Kučera, Richard Krajicek and Alberto Berasategui.

Finals

Singles

 Albert Costa defeated  Àlex Corretja 6–2, 6–0, 1–0, retired.
It was Albert Costa's 1st title of the year, and his 7th overall. It was his 1st Masters title of the year, and overall.

Doubles

 Donald Johnson /  Francisco Montana defeated  David Adams /  Brett Steven 6–4, 6–4

References

External links
  
   
 Association of Tennis Professionals (ATP) tournament profile

 
German Open
ATP German Open
Hamburg European Open